Metstaga is a settlement in Varstu Parish, Võru County in southeastern Estonia.

References

Villages in Võru County